The Almond Tree is a piece for piano solo composed in 1913 by John Ireland (18791962).

A performance takes about 3½ minutes.

References 

Solo piano pieces by John Ireland
1913 compositions